Anne Elizabeth Ramsay is an American actress best known for her role as Lisa Stemple on Mad About You, for which she shared a Screen Actors Guild Award nomination for Best Ensemble in a Comedy series.

Early life
Ramsay was raised in La Habra, CA. 

Ramsay studied theater at UCLA and graduated with a bachelor's degree. She landed her first professional role in an industrial film. She also worked with an acting group called The Continuum, which featured UCLA alumni. Their 1987 production of Waiting, which she co-wrote, won the group acclaim and Ramsay an agent.

Filmography

Film

Television

References

External links
 
 Anne Ramsay at Yahoo! Movies

American film actresses
American television actresses
Actresses from California
Living people
People from La Habra, California
University of California, Los Angeles alumni
20th-century American actresses
21st-century American actresses
Year of birth missing (living people)